Tribute is an entertainment industry magazine published by Tribute Entertainment Media Group that covers film, television, music, pop culture, celebrity lifestyle: beauty and fashion, and red carpet premieres. The magazine is read by over 1,500,000 and is distributed in Canadian theaters six times a year with a circulation of 500,000. Tribute features coverage of the latest news in Hollywood, film previews, fashion, gossip, movie-related books, music, trivia and feature contests. Tribute has provided coverage of the Toronto International Film Festival for more than 15 years.

History
Founded in 1980, Tribute magazine was first published in 1981 with the cover featuring the movie Reds.

Typical content
The magazine features celebrities on the cover and the most exciting movies opening each month. It publishes several "double issues" each year (March/April, May/June, July/August, and October/November) that are available in major theaters across the country.

Monthly features/sections of the magazine
 Previews/must-see movies: A look at upcoming and current movies in theaters. Special issues cover holiday movies and summer blockbusters.
 Flash: Coverage of red carpet events.
 Cover Story: Featuring a major movie or celebrity.
 Interview: Exclusive interview with an actor or director.
 New in Beauty/Grooming: The latest in celebrity beauty trends for women and men. 
 Sex Degrees: A fun look at who has and/or is dating whom in Hollywood.
 Trivia/crossword: Movie related puzzles and trivia questions. 
 Push Play: Featuring new DVD releases.
 Horoscope: Your monthly horoscope plus a celebrity horoscope of the month.
 Web Watch: All the latest features

References

External links
 
 Tribute Movies
 En Primeur
 Tribute magazine archive
 
 Tribute Networks chooses Destiny Media Technologies
 Tribute Entertainment Announces New Tribute Movies iPhone Application

1981 establishments in Ontario
Bi-monthly magazines published in Canada
Entertainment magazines published in Canada
Film magazines published in Canada
Celebrity magazines
Magazines established in 1981
Magazines published in Toronto